Michuhol District (Michuhol-gu) is a municipal district in Incheon, South Korea. This district was called Nam (South) District until July 1, 2018.

Michuhol-gu is the historical heart of old Incheon. It is home to historical sites such as Mt Munhaksan, Dohobucheongsa (the  office building of old Incheon), and Incheon Hyanggyo, the local public school of old Incheon.

Michuhol-gu is now a higher education center of Incheon; the University of Incheon and Inha University are located in Michuhol-gu.

Administrative Divisions of Incheon Michuhol-gu

Dohwa 1 to 3 Dong
Sungui 1 to 4 Dong
Yonghyeon 1 to 5 Dong
Juan 1 to 8 Dong
Hagik 1 and 2 Dong
Gwangyo-dong
Munhak-dong

References

External links
 Michuhol-gu homepage 

 
Districts of Incheon